Pierre-Hugues Herbert and Albano Olivetti were the defending champions but chose not to defend their title.

Nicolas Mahut and Édouard Roger-Vasselin won the title after defeating Michael Geerts and Skander Mansouri 6–2, 6–4 in the final.

Seeds

Draw

References

External links
 Main draw

Open d'Orléans - Doubles
2022 Doubles